Saulius Sondeckis (11 October 1928 – 3 February 2016) was a Lithuanian violinist, conductor, orchestra leader and professor. He founded the Lithuanian Chamber Orchestra in 1960 and was its artistic director and principal conductor until 2004.

Biography
Sondeckis was born in Šiauliai in 1928. He graduated from the Lithuanian Academy of Music and Theatre (Vilnius Conservatory) as a violinist with Alexander Livontas in 1952 and studied conducting with Igor Markevich. Sondeckis was a member of the Department of String Instruments at the Lithuanian SSR State Conservatoire.

Sondeckis began conducting in 1955 and started at the Student Orchestra of the National M.K. Čiurlionis School of Art. He became a teacher at the Lithuanian Academy in 1959 and became a professor there in 1976. In 1960, Sondeckis founded the Lithuanian Chamber Orchestra in 1960 and it gave its first performance on 30 April 1960. He served as its artistic director and principal conductor until 2004.

Sondeckis led the St. Petersburg State Hermitage Orchestra of St. Petersburg (Camerata) from 1989 and from 2005, he has led the Lithuanian Baltic Chamber Orchestra. He has conducted orchestras in many countries and was an honorary member of the Lithuanian Musicians' Union. He is one of the most decorated figures in contemporary classical music in Lithuania, including People's Artist of the USSR (1980), a Laureate of the USSR State Award (1987) and winner of the Lithuania National Award (1999). He has served as a jury member of major international competitions, including Mozart in Salzburg, Tchaikovsky in Moscow and the Toscanini Competitions in Parma. He was also a member of the Herbert von Karajan Foundation in Berlin.

In 2010, Šiauliai Conservatory was renamed after Saulius Sondeckis as Šiauliai Saulius Sondeckis Conservatory. Later it was known as Šiauliai Saulius Sondeckis School of Arts (since 2011) and Šiauliai Saulius Sondeckis Gymnasium of Arts (since 2013).

He died on 3 February 2016 in Vilnius, Lithuania.

References

External links
 Саулюс Сондецкис: «Я в отечественной культуре не задействован»

Lithuanian conductors (music)
Lithuanian violinists
1928 births
2016 deaths
Burials at Antakalnis Cemetery
Musicians from Šiauliai
Lithuanian musicologists
Recipients of the Lithuanian National Prize
Lithuanian Academy of Music and Theatre alumni
Musicians from Vilnius
Moscow Conservatory alumni
Recipients of the Order of Honour (Russia)
People's Artists of the USSR
Soviet classical violinists
20th-century classical violinists
Male classical violinists
Soviet violinists
Soviet conductors (music)
Knights of the Order of Merit of the Republic of Poland
Recipients of the USSR State Prize
20th-century conductors (music)
20th-century male musicians
Recipients of the Order of the Cross of Terra Mariana, 4th Class